Hal Self (February 22, 1922 – June 6, 2008) was an American football player and coach. He served as the head football coach at the University of North Alabama in Florence, Alabama from 1949 to 1969. As a quarterback at the University of Alabama, he played in all four major bowl games: Orange, Cotton, Sugar, and Rose. Self was drafted by the Brooklyn Tigers in the 1945 NFL Draft but opted to stay in college.

References

1922 births
2008 deaths
American football quarterbacks
Alabama Crimson Tide football players
North Alabama Lions athletic directors
North Alabama Lions football coaches
High school football coaches in Alabama
People from Lauderdale County, Alabama
Sportspeople from Decatur, Alabama
Players of American football from Alabama